Glauconoe is a genus of moths of the family Crambidae. It contains only one species, Glauconoe deductalis, which is found in Australia (Queensland), New Guinea, Sri Lanka and Taiwan.

References

Spilomelinae
Crambidae genera
Taxa named by William Warren (entomologist)